Jamilah binti Anu (Jawi: جميلة بنت آنو; born 14 August 1955) is a Malaysian politician who served as Member of Sarawak State Legislative Assembly (MLA) for Tanjong Datu from March 2017 to December 2021.  She is also the widow and the second wife of fifth Chief Minister of Sarawak, Adenan Satem.

Politics 
In 2017, Jamilah was elected as the MLA of Tanjong Datu after she successfully defended the seat in the by-election triggered by the sudden demise of the incumbent MLA, who was also her husband Adenan Satem.

Jamilah opted to retire after four years in politics and not run in the 2021 state election in order to give the responsibility of defending her seat to her son Azizul Annuar Adenan.

Election results

References

External links 
 Jamilah Anu on Facebook

1955 births
Living people
People from Sarawak
Malaysian people of Malay descent
Malaysian Muslims
Sarawak politicians
Members of the Sarawak State Legislative Assembly
Parti Pesaka Bumiputera Bersatu politicians
Knights Commander of the Order of the Star of Hornbill Sarawak
21st-century Malaysian politicians